Odbojkarski klub Merkur Maribor or simply OK Maribor is a Slovenian professional volleyball team based in Maribor. The team play their home games at Tabor Hall and competes in the Slovenian Volleyball League, the top division of Slovenian volleyball. Founded in 1945, the club has won the national championship three times (1992, 1993 and 2021) and the Slovenian national cup four times (1992, 1994, 1995 and 2006).

History
Immediately after the Second World War, on 14 June 1945, the men's volleyball section of the Železničar Sports Association was established. They played in the inaugural edition of the Slovenian national championship in 1946 and finished in fourth place. In 1947, the club was renamed as Odbojkarski klub Železničar. In 1951, the team was relegated from the Slovenian championship.

In 1976, Železničar merged with its city rival Branik and became Odbojkarski klub Maribor. In 1980, Maribor won the Yugoslav second division and qualified for the highest level of Yugoslav volleyball, the Yugoslav Volleyball Championship. The club was relegated during its first top division season, but the following year they won the second division and were thus immediately promoted back. They were also the runners-up of the Yugoslav Cup in 1983. Maribor remained in the top division until 1989, when the Yugoslav League was reorganized and reduced to eight teams. Maribor again immediately returned to the top tier after winning the A2 division in 1990, but the following year the club again dropped out of the Yugoslav top tier. This was also the last season before the breakup of Yugoslavia.

In 1991, Slovenia gained independence from Yugoslavia, and the Volleyball Federation of Slovenia established its own league system. OK Maribor won the first two editions of the newly established Slovenian Volleyball League, becoming back-to-back national champions in 1992 and 1993. As Slovenian champions, the team competed in the 1992–93 edition of the CEV European Champions Cup, where they were eliminated in the first round by the Swiss team Lausanne UC. During the  1990s, Maribor also won the national cup three times and was the league runner-up on several occasions. In January 2006, Maribor, competing under the sponsorship name Prevent Gradnje IGM, won its fourth national cup title by defeating Salonit Anhovo in the final, the first major trophy won by the club in eleven years.

Between 2009 and 2019, the club went through a period of stagnation, never finishing higher than fourth in the league. In 2009–10, Maribor even finished in the last, 12th place. In December 2019, the club signed a sponsorship deal with Merkur and changed its name to Merkur Maribor. In 2021, Maribor won their third national championship after defeating ACH Volley 3–2 in the final, preventing them from winning their 17th consecutive title.

Name changes
Throughout its history, OK Maribor has been named after their main sponsor on numerous occasions:
Stavbar/MTT Maribor (until 1989)
Tehno Mobil (1989–1990)
Vileda Maribor (1990–1994)
Bella Viola Maribor (1994–1995)
Marles Maribor (1995–1996)
Gradis Maribor (1997–1998)
Stavbar IGM Maribor (1998–2004)
Prevent Gradnje IGM (2004–2007)
MTB Maribor (2008–2010)
Lunos Maribor (2013–2015)
Merkur Maribor (2019–present)

Season-by-season records

Players

2021−22 team

Source: Official website

Honours
Slovenian Volleyball League
Winners (3): 1991–92, 1992–93, 2020–21
Runners-up (7): 1993–94, 1995–96, 1996–97, 1998–99, 2002–03, 2005–06, 2006–07

Slovenian Cup
Winners (4): 1991–92, 1993–94, 1994–95, 2005–06
Runners-up (6): 1992–93, 1995–96, 1996–97, 1999–2000, 2019–20, 2021–22

MEVZA League
Runners-up (1): 2020–21

References

External links
Official website 

Slovenian volleyball clubs
Sport in Maribor
Volleyball clubs established in 1945
1945 establishments in Slovenia